Jean Teulère (born 24 February 1954 in Caudéran) is a French equestrian and Olympic champion. He won a team gold medal in eventing at the 2004 Summer Olympics in Athens, and finished 4th in the individual contest.

References

External links

1954 births
Living people
French male equestrians
Olympic equestrians of France
Equestrians at the 1988 Summer Olympics
Equestrians at the 1996 Summer Olympics
Equestrians at the 2000 Summer Olympics
Equestrians at the 2004 Summer Olympics
Olympic gold medalists for France
Event riders
Olympic medalists in equestrian
Medalists at the 2004 Summer Olympics
Sportspeople from Bordeaux